Chlorbisan is a toxic halogenated organosulfide.  It is used as a microbicide.

References

Thioethers
Phenols
Chloroarenes
Antimicrobials